Herne is a city in North Rhine-Westphalia, Germany. It is located in the Ruhr area directly between the cities of Bochum and Gelsenkirchen.

History 

Like most other cities in the region, Herne (ancient Haranni) was a tiny village until the 19th century. When the mining of coal (and possibly ore) and the production of coke (the fuel processed from the harvested coal) and steel began, the villages of the Ruhr area slowly grew into towns and cities because of the influx of people, mostly from the East (Germany as well as East-Prussia, Bohemia, Moravia, Silesia, Poland and beyond, even Italy and Spain), looking for, and finding, work.

Herne is located on the direct axis between Bochum to the South and Recklinghausen to the North, with Münster yet further North; Gelsenkirchen lies to the West, and Castrop-Rauxel and Dortmund to the East. The physical border between Herne and Recklinghausen in fact is, and has been for a long time, the bridge at the Bochumer Strasse across the Rhine–Herne Canal (the south shore of the Canal is Herne, the North shore is Recklinghausen).  A little further north of the canal flows the Emscher River, which was a major known location because of the former abundance of wild horses that were caught in the Emscher Valley (Emschertal), then sold and/or traded at the yearly horse market at Crange, which later developed into the "Cranger Kirmes", now a World renowned Fair and the largest family kermess in Germany. After World War II Herne was known as "Die Goldene Stadt" (The Golden City) because of the comparatively limited damage suffered during World War II.

Present-day Herne includes the former settlements of Haranni, originating at the South end of the Bahnhofstrasse and just across the Evangelische Hauptkirche Herne (main Lutheran Church—seems to be called "Kreuzkirche" now) and the crossing of Sodingerstrasse, running to the East at that point, then turning into Wiescherstrasse; Haranni used to be somewhat hidden at about 9:40 hrs. In reference to the "Kreuzkirche", if you will, but seems to be totally obliterated, razed, eliminated, forgotten, the sole reference to Haranni [beautiful, old, quaint, small "timbered buildings"] seemingly resting with the very short "Harannistrasse". Herne, Wanne and Eickel as well as formerly independent settlements or villages like Baukau, Börnig, Crange, Horsthausen, Pöppinghausen, Sodingen et al. became the present Herne.  Farms bearing these names were probably or possibly founded in the 11th and 12th centuries and were later integrated at one time or another into the city of Herne. In 1860 the first of a number of many coal mines started operating. In the following thirty years the population increased twentyfold. For the first time, Herne would be called a city. The same process took place in Wanne and Eickel, the two of which merged in 1926 to form the new city of ""Wanne-Eickel"". In 1975 Wanne-Eickel, by then a city with over 70,000 inhabitants, was incorporated into Herne, which had a population considerably larger than ""Wanne-Eickel"" at that point in time.

World War II 
Herne was targeted by the RAF on 4 June 1940, early in World War II, and air-raids became daily and nightly occurrences. On one occasion, three high-explosive torpedo-bombs were dropped, severely damaging a number of houses in the Vincke-Strasse (only some of the outer shell had remained) and resulting in the deaths of all the inhabitants. Phosphorus bombs were dropped in several locations and caused fires that lasted for days. Because Herne had a lot of undeveloped land, however, damage during the following years of often multiple daily and nightly air-raids with many "blind hits" was not very extensive, in contrast to more densely populated and developed areas like Essen [Krupp Werke] and Wuppertal, which were almost totally erased.  Herne was probably targeted because of the many coal mines as well as the Rhein-Herne Kanal with two double chambered locks (a total of four chambers) at that time, within the city-confines of Herne and at the northern edge.  The canal was the major mode of transportation for coal and coke from the many coal mines in the area to the factories for iron ore to be processed into steel (Blau-Stahl) and coal being transported along the inter-connecting waterways in all other directions, to be used for industrial as well as domestic use. In particular, the Bridge across the Rhine-Herne Canal closest to the easternmost double-chambered lock and the wharf (for repair of damaged Canal-going vessels) on the North shore, was hit and taken out, so that there was no connection across the Canal at that location (at the time, the Street there was known as Ludwig-Strasse but has been renamed since to Pöppinghauser Strasse).  The locks have been renovated, each of those two double-chambered locks having been combined into just one single-chambered lock each, albeit considerably larger chambered, to accommodate much larger vessels.

"Goldfinger" and "Otto Normalverbraucher" star Gerd Fröbe was a native of Wanne-Eickel, as were a number of other well known actors as well as a singing duo popularizing "Der Mond von Wanne-Eickel" (The Moon of Wanne-Eickel).

The Krupp Treibstoffwerke oil refinery near the local Shamrock ¾ coal mine was bombed during the Oil Campaign of World War II.

Politics

Mayor 
The current Mayor of Herne is Frank Dudda of the Social Democratic Party (SPD), elected in 2015 and re-elected in 2020. The most recent mayoral election was held on 13 September 2020, and the results were as follows:

! colspan=2| Candidate
! Party
! Votes
! %
|-
| bgcolor=| 
| align=left| Frank Dudda
| align=left| Social Democratic Party
| 30,758
| 63.4
|-
| bgcolor=| 
| align=left| Timon Radicke
| align=left| Christian Democratic Union
| 8,685
| 17.9
|-
| bgcolor=| 
| align=left| Pascal Krüger
| align=left| Alliance 90/The Greens
| 5,014
| 10.3
|-
| bgcolor=| 
| align=left| Daniel Kleibömer
| align=left| The Left
| 2,026
| 4.2
|-
| bgcolor=| 
| align=left| Thomas Bloch
| align=left| Free Democratic Party
| 2,025
| 4.2
|-
! colspan=3| Valid votes
! 48,508
! 98.0
|-
! colspan=3| Invalid votes
! 980
! 2.0
|-
! colspan=3| Total
! 49,488
! 100.0
|-
! colspan=3| Electorate/voter turnout
! 119,462
! 41.4
|-
| colspan=5| Source: State Returning Officer
|}

City council 

The Herne city council governs the city alongside the Mayor. The most recent city council election was held on 13 September 2020, and the results were as follows:

! colspan=2| Party
! Votes
! %
! +/-
! Seats
! +/-
|-
| bgcolor=| 
| align=left| Social Democratic Party (SPD)
| 21,560
| 44.1
|  0.6
| 28
|  1
|-
| bgcolor=| 
| align=left| Christian Democratic Union (CDU)
| 9,775
| 20.0
|  5.9
| 12
|  3
|-
| bgcolor=| 
| align=left| Alliance 90/The Greens (Grüne)
| 7,723
| 15.8
|  6.5
| 10
|  4
|-
| bgcolor=| 
| align=left| Alternative for Germany (AfD)
| 4,127
| 8.4
|  4.3
| 5
|  3
|-
| bgcolor=| 
| align=left| The Left (Die Linke)
| 1,980
| 4.1
|  2.2
| 3
|  1
|-
| bgcolor=| 
| align=left| Free Democratic Party (FDP)
| 1,615
| 3.3
|  0.5
| 2
| ±0
|-
| bgcolor=| 
| align=left| Pirate Party Germany (Piraten)
| 767
| 1.6
|  1.1
| 1
|  1
|-
| 
| align=left| Independent Citizens Herne (UB Herne)
| 804
| 1.6
|  0.0
| 1
| ±0
|-
| colspan=7 bgcolor=lightgrey| 
|-
| 
| align=left| Voters' Association Wanne-Herne (WWH)
| 443
| 0.9
| New
| 0
| New
|-
| bgcolor=| 
| align=left| Independents
| 49
| 0.1
| –
| 0
| –
|-
! colspan=2| Valid votes
! 48,843
! 98.6
! 
! 
! 
|-
! colspan=2| Invalid votes
! 694
! 1.4
! 
! 
! 
|-
! colspan=2| Total
! 49, 537
! 100.0
! 
! 62
!  2
|-
! colspan=2| Electorate/voter turnout
! 119,462
! 41.5
!  0.7
! 
! 
|-
| colspan=7| Source: State Returning Officer
|}

Gallery 

The largest communities of migrants:

Notable places 
A fair called Cranger Kirmes is held in the city's Crange district every first week of August. This is the second largest carnival in Germany with an average of around 4,500,000 visitors. Its origins can be traced back to the 15th century, when farmers started trading horses on Saint Lawrence's Day. That is why the official opening always takes place on the first Friday in August. The horse market tradition is kept up, by arranging a horse show and horse equipment sales at the same place where horses were traded years ago.
Today there are about 500 stalls every year covering 111,000 square metres, meaning that it takes a 5 kilometre walk to see the whole fairground. Among other things you can buy sugared almonds and all kinds of other food, visit beer gardens, win prizes in shooting galleries or tombolas, or enjoy traditional and new rides like roundabouts, ghost trains and all sorts of high-tech delights. One of the main attractions is the 60-metre high big wheel that is the largest movable one in the world.

Notable people 
Famous Hernians or Wanne-Eickelians include 
 Cigdem Akyol
 Yıldıray Baştürk 
 Kurt Edelhagen
 Gudrun Heute-Bluhm
 Andrea Jürgens, Dr. Claudia Dollins (Geier) 
 Jürgen von Manger (known as „Mr. Tegtmeier“, see Tegtmeiers Reisen) 
 Jürgen Marcus 
 Heinz Rühmann (few years) 
 Bernd Storck
 Peavy Wagner, Leonie Saint and Bärbel Beuermann
 Gregor Willmes, musicologist
 Rudolf Witzig 
 Jan Zweyer

Economy 
Notable business
Heitkamp BauHolding, founded 1892, specialized construction work in different construction business areas

Sports 
Herne is well known for the women basketball team „Herner TC“. They won the German championship and cup in 2019. 
Herne-West is a mockery name of the football club Schalke 04, most commonly used by the fans of Borussia Dortmund.

Twin towns – sister cities

Herne is twinned with:

 Hénin-Beaumont, France (1954)
 Castleford, England, United Kingdom (1956)
 Altagracia, Nicaragua (1988)
 Moyogalpa, Nicaragua (1988)
 Belgorod, Russia (1990)
 Eisleben, Germany (1990)
 Konin, Poland (1991)
 Beşiktaş, Turkey (2016)
 Luzhou, China (2018)

References

External links 

 Herne Notgeld (emergency banknotes) depicting the legend of "Der tolle Jost von Strünkede" webgerman.com/Notgeld/Directory/H/Herne.htm

 
Cities in North Rhine-Westphalia